Kawngkan is a village on the Chindwin River in Homalin Township, Hkamti District, in the Sagaing Region of northwestern Burma. It is located next to Homalin Airport.

References

External links
 Maplandia World Gazetteer

Populated places in Hkamti District
Homalin Township